Boesenbergia siphonantha is a species of flowering plant in the ginger family Zingiberaceae and tribe Zingibereae.  Records of occurrence are from the Andaman islands, Thailand and Vietnam.

References

External links
 
 

Zingiberoideae
Flora of Indo-China